Voorschoten is a railway station in Voorschoten, Netherlands. The first station opened on 1 May 1843 on the Amsterdam–Rotterdam railway. A new station building opened in 1886 and was closed on 17 September 1944. The station re-opened in 1969 and a hexagonal shaped station building opened. A new station was opened in 1995. The train services are operated by Nederlandse Spoorwegen.

Train services
The following services currently call at Voorschoten:
2x per hour local service (sprinter) The Hague - Leiden - Schiphol - Duivendrecht - Hilversum - Utrecht
2x per hour local service (stoptrein) The Hague - Leiden - Haarlem

External links
NS website 
Dutch Public Transport journey planner 

Railway stations in South Holland
Railway stations in the Netherlands opened in 1843
Railway stations in the Netherlands closed in 1944
Railway stations in the Netherlands opened in 1969
Railway stations on the Oude Lijn
1843 establishments in the Netherlands
Voorschoten
Railway stations in the Netherlands opened in the 20th century
Railway stations in the Netherlands opened in the 1960s